The 1950 New South Wales state election was held on 17 June 1950. It was conducted in single member constituencies with compulsory preferential voting and was held on boundaries created at a 1949 redistribution. The election was for all of the 94 seats in the Legislative Assembly, which was an increase of 4 seats since the previous election.

At the time of the election, Labor had been in power for 9 years, Jim McGirr had been the Premier for 3 years and Labor had lost power federally to the Liberal Party of Robert Menzies 6 months earlier. The NSW Labor Government, under McGirr, was beginning to show signs of age. Severe divisions had appeared in the party at the beginning of 1950 when the state executive expelled 4 members of the Assembly James Geraghty (North Sydney), John Seiffert (Monaro), Roy Heferen (Barwon) and Fred Stanley (Lakemba) from the parliamentary party for breaking party solidarity during the 1949 indirect election of the Legislative Council. They had apparently voted for Bill McNamara who was 9th on the Labor ticket. All four served out the remainder of their terms as independents and stood in the election as Independent Labor candidates. An attempt by the caucus to overturn the expulsions led to resentment among party branch members which was reflected in the pre-selection defeat of four members who were standing for re-election; Baden Powell, Bob Gorman, Mary Quirk and Kevin Dwyer. Two members of Lang Labor: Chris Lang (Auburn) and Lilian Fowler (Newtown) were still in the Assembly and they both stood for re-election.

In contrast, the Liberal Party, which had been founded by in 1945, continued to consolidate its position as the pre-eminent conservative party. It was led by Vernon Treatt and presented a solid front to the electorate. The Liberals had won three seats from Labor at by-elections for Concord, Coogee and Kogarah. The Country Party was led by Michael Bruxner and remained closely aligned to the Liberals.

Key dates

Results

The result of the election was a hung parliament. The balance of power lay with the two re-elected Independent Labor members, James Geraghty and John Seiffert, who had been expelled from the party for disloyalty during the previous parliament. As Seiffert had not stood against an endorsed Labor candidate for Monaro, he was readmitted to the party and together with the support of Geraghty, McGirr and Labor were able to stay in power. Labor gained the two Lang Labor seats. Of the other two seats held by expelled members, Labor re-gained Lakemba while the Country Party won Barwon. Labor also lost Hawkesbury to the Liberal Party and Mudgee and Dubbo to the Country Party. The sitting Independent members for South Coast and Gloucester had joined the Liberal Party and the Country Party respectively prior to this election. During the parliament there were 4 by-elections with the result of a net gain to Labor of 1 seat (Ashfield).

The near loss of the election weakened McGirr's position and he was replaced as premier by Joseph Cahill in April 1952. Treatt remained the Leader of the Opposition during the period of this parliament and Bruxner continued as the Leader of the Country Party, a position he had held since 1932.
{{Australian elections/Title row
| table style = float:right;clear:right;margin-left:1em;

| title        = New South Wales state election, 17 June 1950
| house        = Legislative Assembly
| series       = New South Wales state election
| back         = 1947
| forward      = 1953
| enrolled     = 1,919,479
| total_votes  = 1,611,349
| turnout %    = 92.75
| turnout chg  = −1,86
| informal     = 28,964
| informal %   = 1.77
| informal chg = −0.22
}}

|}

The final two party preferred result was Labor 51% to Coalition 49%.

Retiring members

Seats changing party representation

See also
 Candidates of the 1950 New South Wales state election
 Members of the New South Wales Legislative Assembly, 1950–1953

Notes

References

Elections in New South Wales
1950 elections in Australia
1950s in New South Wales
June 1950 events in Australia